is a 1931 black and white Japanese silent film with benshi accompaniment directed by Daisuke Itō. It is the only completely preserved silent film directed by Ito and related the life of a legendary thief, Jirokichi the Rat, in an exquisite original story and through the revolutionary use of dynamic intertitles. The trio composed  of director Ito, top-class cinematographer Karasawa and lead actor Denjirō Ōkōchi won great popularity for their masterful work.

External links
Oatsurae Jirokichi goshi  on Internet Movie Database

1931 films
Nikkatsu films
Japanese silent films
Films directed by Daisuke Itō (film director)
Japanese black-and-white films
Japanese action films
Japanese drama films
1930s action films
1931 drama films
Silent drama films